Mr. Scruff is the eponymous debut studio album by Mr. Scruff. It was released via Pleasure Music on May 12, 1997.

The album saw the emergence of one of Scruff's obsessions – sea-life. The opening track, "Sea Mammal", was the first of several to use cut-up recordings of voice-overs from children's stories and nature documentaries to create surreal and silly stories. The track is a tribute to Boogie Down Productions' track "My Philosophy", and was originally released as the B-side to Scruff's debut release, the single "Hocus Pocus" (1995). The album also contains another track that references sea creatures – the album's closer, "Wail" (being a homophone for "whale").

The album is currently out of print, but in 2005 it was remastered and re-released via Ninja Tune under the name Mrs. Cruff, containing three additional tracks.

Track listing

Trivia
The song "Limbic Funk" samples audio from The Hitchhiker's Guide to the Galaxy.

References

Mr. Scruff albums
1997 debut albums
Ninja Tune albums